Kaptai Lake is the largest lake in Bangladesh. It is located in the Kaptai Upazila under Rangamati District of Chittagong Division. The lake was created as a result of building the Kaptai Dam on the Karnaphuli River, as part of the Karnaphuli Hydro-electric project.

History
Construction of the reservoir for the hydro-electric plant began in 1956 by the Government of East Pakistan. As a result,  of farmland in the Rangamati District went underwater and created the lake. The hydro-electric project was funded by the United States. The project was finished in 1962.
International Engineering Company and Utah International Inc. received the contract for construction of the dam. The dam is 670.8 meters long, and 54.7 meters high. Through the spillway  of water can pass.

The land that went underwater as a result of the dam construction, was 40% of the total arable land in the area. About 18,000 hagu families with a total of almost 100,000 people were displaced. The palace of the king of the Chakmas was also flooded and is now underwater.

Gallery

See also
 Mahamaya irrigation project
 Kaptai National Park

References

External links
 Kaptai Lake at Banglapedia
 Kaptai Lake Rangamati at Travel Mate

Reservoirs in Bangladesh
Karnaphuli River
Chittagong Division
Rangamati Hill District
History of Chittagong Division
Infrastructure completed in 1962
Tourist attractions in Bangladesh
1962 establishments in East Pakistan